Lopez Holdings Corporation (formerly Benpres Holdings Corporation until July 5, 2010 and also known as Lopez, Inc.) is a Filipino conglomerate founded by the brothers Eugenio Lopez, Sr. and Fernando Lopez, Sr. It has substantial holdings in the public service and utilities sector in the Philippines and serves as the Lopez family's publicly listed holding company for investments in major development sectors such as broadcasting and cable; telecommunications; power generation and distribution; manufacturing; and property development. It added to its portfolio investments in other basic service sectors but has also since sold its interest in banking, toll roads, information technology, and health care delivery.

Lopez Holdings Corporation is majority-owned by Lopez, Inc., a private holding and investment entity of the Lopez family.

Businesses

Media and Telecommunications

ABS-CBN Corporation (alternatively known as ABS-CBN Broadcasting Corporation even after the former started to be used on May 27, 2010) - a publicly listed company and the country's largest media conglomerate. It is currently involved in broadcast radio, television and new media as well as cable television (Sky Cable Corporation, Creative Programs, Inc.), television programming (Dreamscape Entertainment, Star Creatives Television), films (Star Cinema, Black Sheep Productions, Skylight Films), theater (Teatro Kapamilya), news (ABS-CBN News), publishing (ABS-CBN Publishing), talent agency (Star Magic, etc.), licensing, radio (TeleRadyo, MOR Entertainment), music (Star Music, Tarsier Records), merchandise (ABS-CBN Store), events and concerts (ABS-CBN Events, Star Events, Ktx.ph), streaming platforms (iWantTFC), digital media (Kapamilya Online Live) and websites (news.abs-cbn.com). Its flagship television station, ABS-CBN (permanently replaced by Kapamilya Channel, and ABS-CBN (as a broadcast syndication) affiliated with blocktime channels: A2Z under ZOE Broadcasting Network and other networks and platforms is the leading television network in the country and is available worldwide through The Filipino Channel. Lopez Holdings owns 57.24% of ABS-CBN Corporation as of 2014.
Sky Vision Corporation - is a holding company incorporated on March 25, 1991, with the primary purpose of owning controlling stocks on Sky Cable Corporation. It started commercial operations on February 1, 1992. It is owned 55% by ABS-CBN Corporation, 5% by Lopez Holdings Corporation and 40% by Sampaquita Communications Pte. Ltd. Sky Cable acquired Destiny Cable in 2012.

Power and Energy
First Philippine Holdings Corporation (First Holdings) - a holding company whose core businesses are in power generation and distribution, with strategic initiatives in manufacturing, property and infrastructure. Lopez holdings owns 46.6% of FPHC as of December 2011.

Power Generation
First Gen Corporation (First Gen) - is the holding company of First Holdings in power generation and energy-related businesses. First Holdings owns 76% of First Gen.
First Gas Holdings Corporation (FGHC) - established in 1994 as a joint-venture between First Holdings and the BG Group to develop natural gas projects in the Philippines using natural gas from the Malampaya gas field. FGHC is now a wholly owned subsidiary of First Gen acquiring the 40% interest of BG Group in 2012. 
First Gas Power Corporation (FGPC) - established in 1994 as a joint-venture between First Holdings and the BG Group to operate a 1,000 MW combined cycle gas turbine power plant in Santa Rita, Batangas. In May 2012, First Gen acquired the 40% interest of the BG Group, making FGPC an indirect wholly owned subsidiary of First Gen. 
FGP Corporation (FGP) - established in 1997 as a joint-venture between First Holdings and the BG Group to operate a 500 MW gas turbine combined cycle power plant in San Lorenzo, Batangas. In May 2012, First Gen acquired the 40% interest of the BG Group, making FGPC an indirect wholly owned subsidiary of First Gen. 
FGP San Gabriel is a 420 MW combined cycle gas turbine plant which was established in 2016 as an indirect wholly owned subsidiary of First Gen.
FG Hydro Power Corporation - First Gen Hydro Power Corporation (FG Hydro) was incorporated as a wholly owned subsidiary of First Gen.
FG Bukidnon Power Corporation
First Gen Renewables, Inc. (FGRI), formerly known as First Philippine Energy Corporation, was established in 1978 to develop prospects in the renewable energy market. First Gen owns 100% of FGRI.
Energy Development Corporation - established in 1976,accounts for more than 60% of the country’s installed geothermal capacity. Its plants are located in the provinces of Leyte, Negros Oriental, Negros Occidental, Bicol and North Cotobato. In November 2007, First Gen Corporation bid for and won a 60-percent economic stake in EDC. As of 2011 First Gen owns over 46% of EDC.

Power Distribution
Manila Electric Company (Meralco) - acquired by the Lopez Group 1962 and developed into a power-distributing company. Between 2009 and 2012, the Lopez Group would reduce its 33.4% holdings in MERALCO by selling most of its shares to the First Pacific Group. Since 2012, the Lopez Group's maintains a 3.95% interest (one board seat) in MERALCO. 
 Panay Electric Company (PECO) - First Holdings entered into a joint venture with the Panay Electric Company, Inc. (PECO) in March 1996 for the construction of a US 72 million diesel-fired power plant in Iloilo City.  First Holdings acquired a 30 percent equity in PECO.  In turn, PECO subscribed to a 30 percent equity interest in Panay Power Corporation. First Holdings currently owns 30% of PECO.

Real estate
 Rockwell Land Corporation (RLC) - a high-end real estate development corporation initially tasked to develop the Rockwell Center in Makati. Rockwell Land was established in 1995.  FPHC now owns 85% of Rockwell Land after buying the shares of MPIC and SMC groups in Rockwell Land.
First Philippine Industrial Park (FPIP) - a 315-hectare industrial estate. FPIP is a joint venture with Sumitomo Corporation of Japan which owns 30% while First Holdings owns 70%, formed in 1996 to develop an industrial park located in Sto. Tomas, Batangas.
 First Philippine Realty Corp., formerly known as INAEC Development Corporation - primarily engaged in the acquisition, disposal, or lease of real and personal property.  FPRC is a wholly-owned subsidiary of First Holdings.
 TerraPrime Inc. - incorporated in May 2011 as a joint-venture between First Balfour and Estuar Development Corporation. The company is engaged in real estate development.

Infrastructure
 First Balfour, Inc. - is one of the country’s largest engineering and construction companies today, with 49 years in business. First Balfour, Inc. is a wholly owned subsidiary of First Philippine Holdings.
 First Philippine Industrial Corp.- owns and operates the sole, largest commercial oil pipeline in the country, transporting crude and refined petroleum products from Batangas to Metro Manila. FPIC is 60% owned by First Holdings, in partnership with Shell Petroleum Co., Ltd. (UK) which owns 40%.

Manufacturing
First Philippine Electric Corp. (First Philec) 
Philippine Electric Corporation (Philec) 
First Electro Dynamics Corporation (FEDCOR) 
First Philippine Power Systems, Inc. (FPPS) 
First Sumiden Circuits, Inc. (FSCI) 
First Sumiden Realty, Inc. 
First Philec Solar Corporation

Other Businesses of the Lopez Group 
 Asian Eye Institute 
 Bayad Center 
 Securities Transfer Services Inc. (STSI) 
 ADTEL
 INAEC Aviation Corporation

Former Businesses
Bayan Telecommunications Holdings Corporation (Bayan Holdings) - owns Bayan Telecommunications, one of the telecommunications company in the Philippines providing a full range of services which includes local exchange, domestic long distance, international long distance, data and payphone services. As of May 2011, Lopez Holdings held 47.3% Bayan Holdings. In 2013, Ayala-led Globe Telecom took over 98% of BayanTel via a debt to equity deal.
Maynilad Water Services - joint-venture between Benpres Holdings Corporation and Ondeo Water Services, Inc. (formerly Suez Lyonnaise de Eaux). Benpres left the joint-venture in 2006 in order to settle a debt of US$150 million.
The Medical City - in April 2008, Benpres sold its entire 18% stake in The Medical City to Lombard for Php600 million.
Tollways - in 2008, First Philippine Infrastructure Development Corporation and NLEX Corporation were sold to Metro Pacific Investments Corporation.
Philippine Commercial International Bank (PCI Bank) - a joint venture between Benpres and the JG Summit Holdings. In 1999, both groups sold their shares in the bank to SSS and GSIS. The shares were later acquired by and merged with Equitable Bank and renamed Equitable PCI Bank. In 2005, the SM Group would acquire Equitable PCI Bank and merged in 2006 with Banco de Oro to be renamed BDO Unibank.

Notes

References

Sources
 The Lopez Family: its Origins and Genealogy, edited and introduced by Oscar M. Lopez lopez-museum.org
 Phoenix: The Saga of the Lopez Family by Raul Rodrigo
 The Power and the Glory: the story of the Manila Chronicle 1945-1998
 Lopez Holdings Corporation, official corporate website
 Lopez Family Values -- Philanthropy in the Philippines as published in The Synergos Institute's Global Giving Matters
 Lopez Link, the monthly newsletter of the Lopez Group of companies

Further reading
 Oscar M. Lopez Timeline: Living life well
 Oscar M. Lopez Show me the Numbers
 International Association of Business Communicators (IABC) Philippines  2010 Lifetime Achievement Award in Communication Excellence in Organizations
 The Lopez Family story: UNDAUNTED as seen through the eyes of Oscar M. Lopez

 
Holding companies of the Philippines
Conglomerate companies established in 1993
Companies based in Pasig
Companies based in Mandaluyong
Holding companies established in 1993
Philippine companies established in 1993